Traktorny is a rural locality (a passing loop) in Bezrukavsky Selsoviet, Rubtsovsky District, Altai Krai, Russia. The population was 86 as of 2013. There is 1 street.

Geography 
Traktorny is located 11 km north of Rubtsovsk (the district's administrative centre) by road. Bezrukavka and Opytny are the nearest rural localities.

References 

Rural localities in Rubtsovsky District